State Road 433 (NM 433) is a  state highway in the US state of New Mexico. NM 433's southern terminus is at NM 104, and the northern terminus is at Conchas State Park.

Major intersections

See also

References

433
Transportation in San Miguel County, New Mexico